Ferne may refer to:

People

With the surname
 Henry Ferne (1602–1662), English bishop
 Hortense Ferne (1885–1976), American artist
 John Ferne (1553–1609), English writer, lawyer and MP

With the given name
 Ferne Carter Pierce (1920–1978), American farmer and politician
 Ferne Jacobs, American fiber artist and basket maker
 Ferne Koch (1913–2001), American photographer
 Ferne Labati (born 1947), American former basketball coach
 Ferne McCann (born 1990), English model, television personality, and presenter
 La Ferne Price (1926–2016), American baseball player
 Ferne Snoyl (born 1985), Dutch former professional footballer

Places
 Ferne, Wiltshire, a hamlet in Berwick St John parish, England
 Ferne House, a historic house in Donhead St Andrew parish, Wiltshire, England; adjacent to the hamlet
 Ferne Animal Sanctuary, an animal sanctuary in Wambrook, Somerset, England
 Ferne Clyffe State Park, a state park in Johnson County, Illinois, United States

See also
 Capel-le-Ferne, Kent, England, a village
 Fern (disambiguation)